"Somewhere on a Beach" is a song recorded by American country music artist Dierks Bentley. It was released for digital download on January 19, 2016, and to country radio on January 25, 2016, as the lead single from his eighth studio album, Black. The song was written by Michael Tyler, Jaron Boyer, Alexander Palmer, Dave Kuncio and Josh Mirenda.

"Somewhere on a Beach" reached number one on the U.S. Billboard Country Airplay chart, giving Bentley his fourteenth number-one hit on the U.S. country music chart. It also gave him his first number-one hit on the Hot Country Songs chart since 2012's "5-1-5-0", and his ninth top 40 hit on the Billboard Hot 100 with a peak at number 35. The song was certified 2× Platinum by the Recording Industry Association of America (RIAA), denoting sales of over two million units in the United States. Its chart success in Canada was similarly received, as it peaked at number one on the Country chart and number 59 on the Canadian Hot 100. It also garnered a Platinum certification from Music Canada for selling over 80,000 units in that country.

The accompanying music video for the song was directed by Wes Edwards.

Content
This is a song in which the narrator is talking to his ex-girlfriend about his life after they broke up. He tells her he has a new girlfriend and adds that she and him are together having fun together "somewhere on a beach".

The song has been compared to Bentley's previous hits "Drunk on a Plane" (2014) and "How Am I Doin'" (2004).

Reception

Critical
The website, Taste of Country, gave the song a positive review, saying it is "fair to call the soulful country-blues song a sequel to “Drunk On a Plane”: "Somewhere on a Beach" details what happens once that plane lands". It also compared the song's atmosphere favorably to Kenny Chesney's musical style.

Commercial
The song debuted at numbers 26 and 29, respectively, on the U.S. Billboard Hot Country Songs and Country Airplay charts during its first week, selling over 19,000 copies in the United States. In its second week, it rose to No. 20 on Hot Country Songs, and entered the Billboard Hot 100 at number 98, with an additional 22,000 copies sold. The song became Bentley's eleventh number one hit on the Hot Country Songs chart in April 2016. It also peaked at number 35 on the Hot 100 that same week. As of August 2016, the song has sold 640,000 copies in the US.

Live performances
Bentley debuted the song on January 19, 2016, on The Ellen DeGeneres Show.

Performed at Luke Bryan's Crash My Playa VIP event on January 23 at the Barcelo Maya resort in Playa del Carmen, Mexico.

Bentley performed the song as part of his hosting of the 2016 Academy of Country Music Awards.

Music video
The music video was directed by Wes Edwards and premiered in February 2016. Filmed in a seaside fishing village in Puerto Moreles, Mexico, it continues the story of one of the passengers from "Drunk on a Plane" (which Edwards also directed), played by Josh Hoover. It begins as the plane from "Drunk" lands, and Josh is seen getting off (still with his neck pillow on) and meeting a sexy girl at a bar after drinking, then waking up the next morning intoxicated and unaware of what happened the previous day. He and the girl are then seen swimming in a hotel pool together and he is seen giving her a massage on the beach and with her in a lounge chair at the same beach. They are then rescued by a lifeguard before sharing an ice cream cone and getting massaged together (he is seen in a head covering). The final scene shows him throwing a bottle of pills into a campfire at night, with her by his side. Dierks is seen performing the song in 3 locations throughout: at a seaside bar, in an alleyway at night with 2 of his band members, and at a concert.

Personnel
Dierks Bentley - lead vocals
Ross Copperman - acoustic guitar, electric guitar, keyboards, programming, background vocals
Jedd Hughes - electric guitar
Tony Lucido - bass guitar
Danny Rader - bouzouki, acoustic guitar, electric guitar, keyboards, programming
Aaron Sterling - drums, percussion
Bryan Sutton - acoustic guitar

Charts and certifications

Charts

Year end charts

Certifications

Release history

References

2016 singles
2016 songs
Dierks Bentley songs
Capitol Records Nashville singles
Music videos directed by Wes Edwards
Song recordings produced by Ross Copperman
Songs written by Jaron Boyer
Songs about beaches